The 2014 Nanjing Youth Wushu Tournament was a wushu competition which was held from August 22 to 24, 2014 at the Gaochun Gymnasium in Nanjing, China. The name "Nanjing Youth Wushu Tournament" was used to specify that wushu was only an invitational sport at the 2014 Summer Youth Olympics and not an official event.

The International Olympic Committee (IOC) gave the International Wushu Federation (IWUF)  an opportunity to host a wushu competition alongside the 2008 Summer Olympics in Beijing, China which was known as the 2008 Beijing Wushu Tournament. This was done as a special circumstance and so wushu did not have official demonstration sport status. In 2014 as part of the Summer Youth Olympics, wushu was featured as an official demonstration event, but medals earned at this tournament did not contribute to the Olympic medal table.  

Wushu was also part of the Nanjing Sports Lab which was a promotional event for non-Olympic sports. Taolu athletes from around the world took part in this event which featured performances and teaching sessions. The Nanjing Sports Lab was held at the Yuzui Wetland Park.

Qualification 
Athletes qualified at the 2014 World Junior Wushu Championships which was held in March. Invitation to the 2014 Nanjing Youth Wushu Tournament was exclusively for select athletes between the ages of 16 and 18, or Group A athletes. All taolu athletes had to perform routines from the IWUF 3rd set of compulsory routines which were created in 2012.

Medal summary
Nations are ranked according to the similar proceedings of the World Wushu Championships and World Junior Wushu Championships, which follow normal procedures for Olympic events. Countries are ranked by number of gold medals earned, followed by number of silver medals earned, followed by number of bronze medals earned. National federations which did not earn a medal are not shown in the table below.

Taolu

Sanda

Results

Taolu

Men's changquan

Men's daoshu & gunshu combined

Men's jianshu & qiangshu combined

Men's nanquan & nangun combined

Men's taijiquan & taijijian combined

Women's changquan

Women's daoshu & gunshu combined

Women's jianshu & qiangshu combined

Women's nanquan & nandao combined

Women's taijiquan & taijijian combined

Sanda

Men's 52 kg

Men's 60 kg

Men's 70 kg

Women's 52 kg

Women's 60 kg

References 

Wushu competitions
2014 Summer Youth Olympics events
2014 in wushu (sport)
2014 Summer Youth Olympics